Cleburne County Courthouse may refer to:

Cleburne County Courthouse (Alabama), Heflin, Alabama
Cleburne County Courthouse (Arkansas), Heber Springs, Arkansas